Thalassery, formerly Tellicherry, is a municipality and commercial city on the Malabar Coast in Kannur district, in the state of Kerala, India, bordered by the districts of Mahé (Pondicherry), Kozhikode, Wayanad, Kasaragod and Kodagu (Karnataka). Thalassery municipality has a population just under 100,000.

Tellicherry municipality was formed on 1 November 1866 according to the Madras Act 10 of 1865 (Amendment of the Improvements in City act 1850) of the British Indian Empire, making it the second oldest municipality in the state. At that time the municipality was known as Tellicherry Commission, and Tellicherry was the capital of North Malabar. G. M. Ballard, the Malabar collector, was the first President of the municipal commission. Later a European barrister, A. F. Lamaral, became the first Chairman of Thalassery municipality. Thalassery grew into a prominent place during European rule, due to its strategic geographic location. Thalassery has played a significant historical, cultural, educational and commercial role in the history of India, especially during the colonial period. On 9 February 2014, Thalassery taluk was split in two and Iritty taluk was formed. The northeastern hilly region of the former Thalassery Taluk such as Peravoor, Aralam, Ayyankunnu, Kottiyoor, Kelakam are within the Iritty Taluk area.

Etymology
Word Thalassery likely originated from combination of Dravidian linguistic usages Thala (Head) and cheri (low lying settlement). 
Thus, Thalassery or 'starting place of a settlement' or 'head of a settlement'. 
It could also have emerged from Talakkathe cheri, a combination of Talakkate (upper or north) and Cheri (settlement).

The 1885 administration manual vol. 2 of the former Madras Presidency cites research in regional legends and folklore to indicate that the name of Thalassery in ancient Sanskrit literature was Shwetaranyapura.

History

Thalassery was a trade hub where Dutch, British, Portuguese, Chinese, Arab, and Jewish traders had considerable influence in the spice market.

The British established a trading post and built a factory at Tellicherry in 1694, having gained permission from Vadakkalankur, the prince regent of the Raja of Kolathunad. They had already been trading on the Malabar coast for much of that century, buying pepper from merchants, and had established a similar post at Travancore ten years earlier.

In 1761, the British captured Mahé, which lies adjacent to Thalassery, and the settlement was handed over to the ruler of Kadathanadu. The British restored Mahé to the French as a part of the 1763 Treaty of Paris. In 1779, the Anglo-French war broke out, resulting in the French loss of Mahé. In 1783, the British agreed to restore to the French their settlements in India, and Mahé was handed over to the French in 1785.

After the annexation of Malabar, the British called upon Thalassery, the Royal families and other major Nair and Namboothiri feudal lords to return, but this was heavily opposed by some local rulers. Along with heavy taxation and laws that curbed free movement, the appeal resulted in multiple uprisings against the British with heavy casualties to British forces. Thousands of soldiers were killed, but the resistance was eventually defeated.

The British, Dutch and the Portuguese and Christian Missionaries contributed a lot into the field of education, sports, culture and many development of this region.

Geography

Thalassery is in West Coast Of Indian subcontinent, in the northern part of Kerala State. The city has Dharmadam Panchayat in the north, Eranholi and Kodiyeri in the east New Mahé in the south and the Arabian Sea on the west. The palm-fringed terrain has a scenic coastline and features four rivers, canals and hills with orange-hued rock. One of the four rivers is the Mahé River (Mayyazhi river). During the British Raj, the Mahé River was nicknamed the English Channel, because it separated British-ruled Thalassery from French-ruled Mahé. Other rivers are Kuyyali river, Ummanchira river and Anjarakandi River. Muzhappilangad Beach, the sole beach where driving is possible in Kerala (with a 4 km long drivable area), is located within 6 km from the Downtown of Tellicherry.

Unlike southern Kerala, Thalassery region does not have lagoons (Kayal), although many rivers flow through the region. Thalassery however has a large area of mangroves, which is now being protected. The coast has no delta formation. The coastal plain is only a few kilometres in width and is bordered by highlands. The north of Thalassery is Dharmadam, an island area surrounded by two rivers and the sea. On the eastern side, hilly areas start from Kuthuparamba.

Demographics
 India census, Thalassery had a population of 92,558, making it Kerala's eighth largest City in population. Males constitute 47% of the population and females 53%. City has an average literacy rate of 86%, higher than the national average of 59.5%. Both male and female literacy are 86%. In Thalassery, 10% of the population is under 6 years of age.  The Thalassery urban agglomeration consists of the Thalassery municipality and panchayaths of Eranholi, Kadirur, Dharmadam, Muzhappilangad, Pinarayi and New Mahe with a present population of around 300,000.

Hindus make up 61.37% of the population, Muslims 34.30% and Christians 3.64%.

Culture

Thalassery is called as the city of three Cs-Cake, Cricket and Circus as the first bakery in Kerala was established in the city and cricket was first played in India here. 
The British had considerable impact on local culture. As an ancient trade center, the trading and business relations that existed with the Europeans and the Arabs brought people and ideas from many other lands. The European Christian missionaries and the educational reforms they brought played an important role in transforming society.

The Government of Kerala has included Thalassery in its heritage city project. The project includes the preservation of historical structures. Thalassery biryani is popular as an ethnic brand.
Thalassery Cuisine is popular around the world as a blend of Arabian, Persian, Indian and European styles of cooking. Tellicherry pepper is a brand used in Europe.

Painting and sculpture exhibitions are frequently held at the Kerala Lalithakala Akademi art gallery located in Keezhantimukk, Thiruvangad.

Theyyam
Theyyam or Thirayattam is a ritual performance art form that depict the cultural heritage of North Malabar, especially of ancient Kolathunad. Theyyam depicts Shiva bhutaganas, Kali and other deities and cultural heroes. The drama is enacted based on ancient stories and the language used is "Tottam pattu", a primitive form of Malayalam. Theyyam shows the Buddhist influence from centuries ago. Theyyam is usually held from October to May every year. The colour of Theyyam is typically red. Velan is described in the Sangam literature 500 CE. It could have been a tribal ritual art which evolved under Buddhism and the Brahminic revival of Hinduism. This art form is addressed as "Kaliyattom" North of Pazhayangadi Puzha, Kannur, as "Theyyam" South of the river and as "Tirayattom" around Thalassery.

Literature
The first Malayalam short story Vasanavikriti was written by Vengayil Kunhiraman Nayanar in Thalassery. Indulekha, the first major Malayalam novel was published from Thalassery. Veenapoovu, the poem by Kumaran Asan was also published from Thalassery. Thinker and orator M N Vijayan spent a lifetime in Thalassery. Thalassery is also home to writer N Prabhakaran. Actor and screenwriter Sreenivasan hails from Thalassery.

William Logan was conversant in Malayalam, Tamil and Telugu. He is remembered for his 1887 guide to the Malabar District, popularly known as the Malabar Manual.

Journalism
The first two Malayalam newspapers Rajyasamacharam (1847) and Paschimodayam (1847) were published from Illikunnu, Nettoor in Tellicherry by Herman Gundert, who was the editor of the journal and was a religious propagator from German Basal Evangelical Mission Society(BEMP). Rajyasamacharam started publishing from Illikkunnu in Thalassery City.

Circus
Vishnu Pant Chhatre's Great Indian Circus, established in 1880 at Bombay was the first circus establishment in India. A tour of Thalassery led to the meeting of Chhatre with Keeleri Kunhikannan a martial arts trainer. Keeleri Kunjikannan established the first dedicated circus school in India in 1901. He is known as "the father of Kerala Circus". A Circus Academy was inaugurated in Thalassery in 2010.

Cuisine

Thalassery is known for its biryani (in local dialect, biri-yaa-ni) Unlike other biriyani cuisines Thalassery biryani uses Kaima/Jeerakasala rice instead of the usual basmati rice.

The trade of spices from the Malabar coast which began as 1500 BC is still an active business although most of the pepper export is currently from Vietnam. Tellicherry pepper is still considered an important ingredient by chefs globally.

Cricket

In 1800, Arthur Wellesley, 1st Duke of Wellington made Thalassery (then Tellicherry) his base. Wellesley and his colleagues played cricket in the town maidan, often watched by bystanders, who would help the English officers whenever they were short of players. They played were from the dhobi community and the fishermen who lived along the beach. In 1830, the Tellicherry Cricket Club (TCC) was formed. By the 1930s Thalassery had become a major cricket centre. Many teams used to visit the town for matches. The earliest record of a cricket match in Thalassery is a report in Malayala Manorama in 1890. It's about a match between Thalassery and the neighbouring town of Kannur.

Thalassery Stadium, located close to the sea, hosts Ranji Trophy cricket matches quite often. Wellesley is believed to have introduced this game in Kerala in the 18th century for British soldiers garrisoned in the Tellichery Fort. India's first cricket club, which was later named the Town Cricket Club, was formed in 1850 at Tellichery by Wellesley. The Tellichery Cricket ground was the hub of cricket activities those days. An exhibition match was conducted in this ground to raise funds during the First World War.

Education

The educational renaissance of Malabar started from Thalassery due to the influence of European missionaries. Government Brennen College, Thalassery, founded in 1862, is one of the oldest educational institutions in India.

Kannur University Thalassery Campus is located at Palayad, 6 km north of Thalassery. The Basel Evangelic Mission Parsi High school is an English Medium school (established 1856) in Malabar. Dr. Hermann Gundert was a tutor there. Kaikose Ruderasha, a Parsi, donated funds to build the institute with the assistance of German missionaries.

Government Brennen College was started b y Sir Edward Brennen in 1862 as a school. Other colleges in Thalassery include College of Engineering Thalassery, Govt Arts and Science College, Thalassery, Medical College, Anjarakandy, Co-operative College of Nursing, Nettur and Co-operative College of Physiotherapy and para-medical sciences, Nettur.

Other educational institutions include Sports Authority of India Centre, Nettur Technical Training Foundation, St Joseph's Higher Secondary School, Sacred Heart Girls High School, and Basel Evangelical Mission Parsi High School.

Transport
Thalassery Railway Station operates under the Palakkad Railway Division of the Southern Railway. It is a Class 'A' railway station. It is on the Shoranur – Mangalore line. No direct line connects Thalasery to Mysore, although a feasibility study for such a route was funded in 2013.

The nearest airport is Kannur International Airport, located 24 km east from the town. Calicut International Airport 100 km, Mangalore International Airport 170 km and Cochin International Airport 235 km could be alternate choices.

Kanyakumari-Mumbai NH-66 passes through Thalassery. Kozhikode is 66 km from Thalassery. Mangalore is 150 km from Thalassery. Interstate highway, Thalassery-Coorg Road (SH-30) is a major road linking Kerala to Kodagu district of Karnataka State.  Interstate buses ply on this route in a frequency of one in an hour. The hill stations Virajpet in Kodagu and Mananthavady in Wayanad are 82 km away from the town. Regular buses to Bengaluru, which is at a distance of 310 km from Thalassery, operate on a daily basis.

Tourism

The Thalassery carnival, the Beach fest in Muzhappilangad beach and Dharmadam beach are notable attractions. The area's four rivers (Anjarakkandi, Dharmadam, Koduvally and Mahe) around Thalassery town and four beaches (Muzhappilangad, Dharmadam, Thalassery (2 beaches)) with more in Kannur also attract visitors.
Muzhappilangad beach is a 5.5 km long beach in which it is possible to drive vehicles. This beach was listed as one of the top 10 drive in beaches in the world by BBC survey.http://www.bbc.com/autos/story/20160617-the-worlds-best-beaches-for-driving

It is an important center of Kalari payattu and health tourism. Other visitors come to experience Theyyam and explore the area's history, such as Tellicherry Fort.

Thalassery Pier (Kadalpaalam), Overbury's Folly, Pazhassi Dam and Reservoir garden and Malayala Kala Gramam, New Mahe,(7 km from Thalassery) are other attractions. A shipwreck is visible near the Thalassery shore.

Political violence
This area is an epicenter of political violence between RSS and Communists. Communist Party of India (Marxist) (CPI(M)) and the Rashtriya Swayamsevak Sangh (RSS) have been fighting in this area for supremacy for the last 50 years.  Clashes in 2008 left seven people killed and many have been injured. The High Court of Kerala called this manslaughter a "compelling sport" and suggested permanent deployment of Central forces in the affected areas.

Notable residents

Veera Kerala Varma Pazhassi Raja
Hermann Gundert
William Logan
Janaki Ammal (Botanist)
Vainu Bappu
DR.Ayyathan Gopalan
DR.Ayyathan Janaki Ammal (Physician)
Sanjayan (Prof. Mannikoth Ramunni Nair)
O Chandhu Menon
Prof. M.N. Vijayan
Vengayil Kunhiraman Nayanar
Moorkoth Ramunni
Moorkoth Kumaran
Vagbhatananda
Keeleri Kunhikannan
Anadhatheerthan
K. Raghavan
C V Devan Nair
Pinarayi Vijayan
V. Muraleedharan
Kodiyeri Balakrishnan
N Prabhakaran
VP Sathyan
C.K. Vineeth
Sreenivasan
Eranholi Moosa
Shaan Rahman
Deepak Dev
Vineeth Sreenivasan
Dhyan Sreenivasan
Sushin Shyam
 Rayshad Rauf
Chundangapoyil Rizwan

Climate
Thalassery experiences a Tropical monsoon climate under the Köppen climate classification. The wet season starts in June as the South-west monsoon first hits the coastal Kerala and continues until the end of September. A brief pre-monsoon Mango showers interval occurs sometime during April. Precipitation from the North-East Monsoon sets in during the second half of October through November.

See also

 Culture of Thalassery
 Jagannath Temple, Thalassery
 Koorara
 Thiruvangad Sree Ramaswami Temple

References

Further reading
 
 
 
 Thalassery Arivukal K. M. Govi. Thalassery: Sanjayan Samskarika Vedi, 2011

External links

 Thalassery – Land of 3Cs Town:Thalassery
 The Map of Thalassery Town:Google Maps

 
Cities and towns in Kannur district
Populated coastal places in India
Beaches of Kerala